The Speaker of the Himachal Pradesh Legislative Assembly is the presiding officer of the Legislative Assembly of Himachal Pradesh, the main law-making body for the Indian state of Himachal Pradesh. The Speaker is elected in the very first meeting of the Himachal Pradesh Legislative Assembly after the general elections for a term of 5 years from amongst the members of the assembly. The Speaker must be a member of the assembly. The Speaker can be removed from office by a resolution passed in the assembly by an effective majority of its members. In the absence of Speaker, the meeting of  theLegislative Assembly is presided by the Deputy Speaker.

List of the Speakers

References

Lists of legislative speakers in India
Speakers of the Himachal Pradesh Legislative Assembly